Peter Ingram Weir (1864–1943) was a Scottish artist noted for his watercolour paintings of Scottish landscapes.

He exhibited at the Royal Scottish Academy and the Royal Institute of Painters in Watercolours between 1885 and 1888.

His best known work is perhaps his pair of watercolours depicting Granton Pier in the late 19th century, which were discovered in a second hand shop in Australia before being sold at Shapes auction house, Edinburgh in 2013.

References

1864 births
1943 deaths
19th-century Scottish painters
Scottish male painters
20th-century Scottish painters
Artists from Edinburgh
19th-century Scottish male artists
20th-century Scottish male artists